Justin Dill (born 10 November 1994) is a South African cricketer. He was part of South Africa's squad for the 2014 ICC Under-19 Cricket World Cup. He was the leading wicket-taker for Western Province in the 2018–19 CSA 3-Day Provincial Cup, with 34 dismissals in ten matches. In September 2019, he was named in Western Province's squad for the 2019–20 CSA Provincial T20 Cup. In June 2021, he was selected to take part in the Minor League Cricket tournament in the United States following the players' draft.

References

External links
 

1994 births
Living people
South African cricketers
Boland cricketers
Cricketers from Port Elizabeth
Western Province cricketers